Governor McMillin may refer to:

Benton McMillin (1845–1933), 27th Governor of Tennessee
George McMillin (1889–1983), 38th Naval Governor of Guam